To be affluent is to have an abundance of valuable resources or material possessions.

Affluent may also refer to:

 Affluent (geography), a stream or river that flows into a main stem river or a lake
 Affluent (horse), an American Thoroughbred racehorse

See also
 Affluence (disambiguation)
 Wealthy (disambiguation)
 Wealth (disambiguation)